The Olympus Corporation M.Zuiko Digital ED 9–18mm f/4-5.6  is a Micro Four Thirds System lens.  In the Micro Four Thirds format, it is a zoom ranging from wide to ultra-wide.  Like many other Olympus Micro Four Thirds zooms, the front lens elements extend for use, and retract for storage.

The lens is "focus-by-wire"; the grip ring is not mechanically connected to the optics, but instead controls the autofocus motor.  Users can reverse the ring focusing direction in the camera software.

Reviewers found sharpness to be competitive with the alternative Panasonic 7-14mm,  despite a noticeably smaller collapsed size, lack of vignetting, and much lower price.  However, they also note more chromatic aberration, and lower build quality.

External links
 Official Webpage

References

09-18mm F4-5.6